Jean Linssen (1904 – 1961) was a Belgian long-distance runner. He competed in the marathon at the 1928 Summer Olympics.

References

1904 births
1961 deaths
Athletes (track and field) at the 1928 Summer Olympics
Belgian male long-distance runners
Belgian male marathon runners
Olympic athletes of Belgium
Place of birth missing